Otho Myron "Babe" Clark (May 7, 1889 – January 10, 1974) was an American football player who played for the Rochester Jeffersons from 1914 to 1920. He played college football at Cornell, where he also participated in hockey and crew. He was a member of the Sphinx Head honor society and the Sigma Nu fraternity while at Cornell.

References

External links
Just Sports Stats

1889 births
1974 deaths
American football fullbacks
American football centers
American football guards
American football tackles
American football quarterbacks
Cornell Big Red football players
American men's ice hockey defensemen
Cornell Big Red men's ice hockey players
American male rowers
Cornell Big Red rowers
Rochester Jeffersons players
Rochester Jeffersons (NYPFL) players
Players of American football from New York (state)
Ice hockey players from New York (state)
People from Avon, New York
Sportspeople from Rochester, New York